Lubec Channel Light is a sparkplug lighthouse in Lubec, Maine. The lighthouse was listed on the National Register of Historic Places as Lubec Channel Light Station on March 14, 1988. The lighthouse was sold by auction into private hands on 2007.

Description and history
The town of Lubec is located in far eastern Maine, standing across the international border from Canada's Campobello Island.  The Lubec Narrows passes between the two, which are joined by the Franklin Delano Roosevelt Bridge.  South of the bridge lies a shallow bay, which opens into the Gulf of Maine after passing West Quoddy Head Light.  In the 1880s a channel was dredged through the shallows to facilitate seagoing commerce from the port communities of Lubec, Eastport and Calais.  An 1883 report recommended installation of a light on the channel to aid navigation, funding was authorized in 1888, and the light went into operation in 1890.  It was automated in 1939.

The light is set to on the west side of the channel, and is mounted on a concrete foundation set in the muddy channel bottom. Its lower stage is a cast-iron round base, which flares out to support a wide deck. Originally sheltered by a shed roof, this deck is now exposed. The tower's second stage rises above, with a railing around its top, and a narrow third stage which supports the lantern house, also surrounded by a deck and railing. The lantern house is crowned by a spherical ventilator.

See also
National Register of Historic Places listings in Washington County, Maine

References

Lighthouses completed in 1890
Lighthouses on the National Register of Historic Places in Maine
Lighthouses in Washington County, Maine
Lubec, Maine
National Register of Historic Places in Washington County, Maine
1890 establishments in Maine